1909 was the 20th season of County Championship cricket in England and featured a Test series between England and Australia. Kent won the championship and Australia, captained by Monty Noble, won the Test series.

Events
The season was the first in which W. G. Grace had not played a first-class match since 1864. It saw Wiltshire win their second Minor Counties Championship title and the formation of the Imperial Cricket Council, which was later renamed as the International Cricket Council, in London with Australia, England and South Africa as the founding members.

Honours
County Championship – Kent
Minor Counties Championship – Wiltshire
Wisden Cricketers of the Year – Warren Bardsley, Sydney Barnes, Douglas Carr, Arthur Day, Vernon Ransford

Test series

Monty Noble's Australian tourists played 42 first-class matches, including a five Test series to contest The Ashes. Matches included five played in Scotland, including one match against Scotland, one in Ireland against SH Cochrane's XI, and one in Wales against a South Wales team. They lost just four matches on the tour.

The Test series was won 2–1 by Australia with two matches drawn. England, captained by Archie MacLaren, won the first Test at Edgbaston after an Australian first-innings batting collapse on a wet pitch, with Colin Blythe and George Hirst bowling almost unchanged, taking all 20 Australian wickets. The second and third Tests, played at Lord's and Headingley respectively, were Australian victories with the final two Tests at Old Trafford and The Oval drawn. The final match of the series saw the only Test match appearance by Douglas Carr at the age of 37. Carr became the first man to play for England having made his first-class debut earlier in the same season.

County Championship

Kent won their second County Championship title, playing 26 matches with 16 wins and only two losses during the season. Lancashire finished in second place whilst the 1908 winners Yorkshire finished in third. Gloucestershire finished last of the 16 counties which competed in the Championship, with only one win to their name.

After the Championship season was completed there were calls for a move to a two division system. These calls led nowhere in the short term, although for the 1911 County Championship a new system of awarding points was introduced.

Statistics
Ted Arnold and William Burns set a then world record fifth-wicket partnership of 393 runs for Worcestershire against Warwickshire. Kent's Frank Woolley and Arthur Fielder set a record of 235 runs for the tenth-wicket against Worcestershire, an English first-class record which still stands as of 2016.

Batting statistics
The batsmen with the highest runs aggregate in 1909 were:

Jack Mason topped the batting averages with 783 runs at an average of 65.25 from 14 innings. Australians Vernon Ransford, Warwick Armstrong and Bardsley all averaged over 45, the only other batsmen with more than two innings to do so.

Bowling statistics
The leading wicket-takers during the 1909 season were:

W C Smith topped the averages with 95 wickets at an average of 12.43.

Annual reviews
 Wisden Cricketers' Almanack 1910

See also
 Derbyshire County Cricket Club in 1909
 Kent County Cricket Club in 1909

References

External links
 Cricket in England in 1909 – CricketArchive
 Wisden 1910 – CricInfo

1909 in English cricket
English cricket seasons in the 20th century